The King Country Rugby Football Union is a constituent union in the New Zealand Rugby Union. It is located in the central North Island of New Zealand in an area known as the King Country. It was formed in 1922 when the South Auckland Rugby Union was split into three (the other two Unions formed were Waikato and Thames Valley).

The King Country team play from Owen Delany Park, Taupo, Rugby Park, Te Kuiti and Taumarunui Domain, Taumarunui. King Country, like many other heartland unions, have struggled since the start of professional era. In 1996, King Country were in the first division of the NPC and in just 6 years were in the third division.

History 
The original King Country Rugby Union was formed in 1905 by the Manunui, Matapuna, Oio and Kakahi rugby clubs. In 1907, the newly formed Taumarunui rugby club replaced Oio.

The current King Country Rugby Football Union was formed in 1922, by the amalgamation of the first King Country Rugby Union (which was renamed as the Taumarunui Sub-union in 1922) along with the Ruapehu Sub-union in Ohakune (founded 1908), Maniapoto Sub-union in Te Kuiti (1907) and Ohura Valley Sub-union (1920).  These were joined by Otorohanga Sub-union in 1927, Kawhia in 1926 and  Kaitieke in 1933 with the Taupo Sub-union transferring from the Hawkes Bay Rugby Union in 1987.  The Ruapehu Sub-union returned to its original parent union the Wanganui Rugby Union in 1970.

This was the second attempt to establish a Rugby Union in the middle of the North Island, as in 1920 the Rangatiki, Taihape, Ruapehu sub-unions (all affiliated to the Wanganui Rugby Union), and the King Country Union (affiliated to South Auckland) had applied for affiliation as the Main Trunk Union. However, this was declined after the Wanganui Rugby Union objected to the loss of their country players.

In those early years King Country representative games were held in Te Kuiti, Taumarunui and Raetihi or Ohakune. Ōtorohanga was first used for a representative game in 1939 with representative games also being hosted in Tokaanu (1966) and Tūrangi (1967).

King Country played in light blue and green until 1949 when it switched to maroon and gold hoops. In 1980, a maroon jersey with gold collar and cuffs was adopted. The current strip has been used since 1994.

King Country has made 19 challenges for the Ranfurly Shield over the years without success but having come close at times, going down to Taranaki in a hard fought game 11-15 in 1958. In 1969 they came even closer when good mates Colin Meads and Kel Tremain were the respective captains, King Country storming back from 6-19 at half time in a torrid second half before going down 16–19.

A well known and amusing challenge in 1988 against Auckland at Rugby Park in Te Kuiti when “Boris the Boar” mysteriously got onto the field and camped in the Auckland 25 for much of the second half.

With the 2020 Heartland Championship cancelled due to Covid-19 the Rams played three First-Class Fixtures against their traditional Heartland Rivals. King Country lost their first match against Wairarapa-Bush in the inaugural Mead-Lochore Scroll Fixture (18-22). The won their second fixture versus East Coast (34-22) and in their final game they became holders of the Sir Colin Meads Memorial log beating Wanganui 16-11 in Taumarunui. This game was also Carl Carmichaels 100th first-class game.

Championships

Heartland Championship placings

Ranfurly Shield 
King Country have never held the Ranfurly Shield.

King Country in Super Rugby 
King Country along with Waikato, Counties Manukau, Bay of Plenty, Thames Valley and Taranaki make up the Chiefs region.

All Blacks 
There have had 8 players selected for the All Blacks whilst playing for King Country. The most famous King Country All Black is All Black of the century, Sir Colin Meads.

 Kevin Boroevich
 Ronald Bryers
 Phil Coffin
 Jack McLean
 Sir Colin Meads
 Stanley Meads
 Bill Phillips
 Graham Whiting

Additionally, former England captain and coach Martin Johnson played for King Country, during his early career. Further former Welsh hooker Garin Jenkins spent a spell playing for the province in his younger years.

Player records

Clubs 
King Country Rugby Football Union is made up of 11 clubs.

 Bush United Rugby Football Club, Benneydale
 Kio Kio United Sports Club, Maihiihi
 Piopio Rugby Football Club, Piopio
 Taumarunui Districts Rugby Football Club, Taumarunui
 Taumarunui Rugby & Sports Club, Taumarunui
 Taupo Marist, Taupo
 Taupo Rugby & Sports Club, Taupo
 Taupo United Inc. Taupo
 Tongariro Sports Club Inc. Turangi
 Waitete Rugby Football Club, Te Kuiti
 Waitomo Rugby Sports & Recreation Club, Waitomo

Secondary schools 
King Country is geographically is a large union covering a wide area, however the population is very small, as a result there are only a few secondary schools within the region. As a result King Country Rugby Union doesn't have a consolidated Secondary Schools competition, rather the schools play their rugby in over provinces such as Waikato and Bay of Plenty Rugby Unions. These schools are still eligible for the King Country Secondary Schools and U19 Rugby Representative teams however.

 Ōtorohanga College
 Piopio College
 Tauhara College
 Taumarunui High School
 Taupo-nui-a-Tia College
 Te Kuiti High School
 Te Kura o Hirangi, Tūrangi
 Tongariro School, Tūrangi

together these schools are able to challenge for the Sam Te Kaha Shield, which is a challenge shield between all King Country Secondary Schools.

References

External links 
  Official site
 King Country | Rugby Database Profile
 Taumarunui Rugby and Sports Reunion Website
 King Country rugby (NZHistory.net.nz)

New Zealand rugby union teams
New Zealand rugby union governing bodies
Sport in Waikato
Sports organizations established in 1922
1922 establishments in New Zealand
Sport in Taupō